Leighton–Linslade is a civil parish in the district of Central Bedfordshire in Bedfordshire, England, with a population of 37,469 at the 2011 Census.

History
Leighton-Linslade Urban District was formed in 1965 by the merger of Leighton Buzzard Urban District, and Linslade Urban District (previously in Buckinghamshire). Under the Local Government Act 1972 the district was merged into South Bedfordshire in 1974, and was downgraded to a successor parish.

Geography
It consists of the settlements of Leighton Buzzard and Linslade, which have a single town council. The River Ouzel provides the border between the parts, with Leighton to the east and Linslade to the west.  The two are served by Leighton Buzzard railway station, which is actually on the western side.

Governance
The local council is Leighton–Linslade Town Council.

Leighton–Linslade is recognised as a Cycling town by Cycling England, from whom it receives funding to promote cycle use.

The parish participates in international town twinning:
 Coulommiers (France)
 Titisee-Neustadt, (Germany) – since 1991

Arms

Freedom of the Town
The following people and military units have received the Freedom of the Town of Leighton–Linslade.

Individuals
 Mr Walter "Wally" Randall: 10 November 2019.

Military Units
 RAF Stanbridge: 27 April 1987.
 1003 (Leighton Buzzard) Squadron Air Training Corps: 29 January 2001.

See also
 Linslade
 Leighton Buzzard

References

External links
Leighton-Linslade
South Bedfordshire tourist page
Leighton-Linslade History
Befordshir Library service Leighton-Linslade Timeline

Civil parishes in Bedfordshire
Central Bedfordshire District